Elaeocarpus cordifolius is a species of tree in the plant family Elaeocarpaceae.

It is endemic to Borneo. It is known only from Gunung Mulu National Park in Sarawak and one location in Kalimantan, Indonesia.

See also
 List of Elaeocarpus species

References

cordifolius
Endemic flora of Borneo
Taxonomy articles created by Polbot